Palmar erythema is reddening of the palms at the thenar and hypothenar eminences.

Causes
It is associated with various physiological as well as pathological changes, or may be a normal finding:
Portal hypertension
Chronic liver disease (including chronic hepatitis)
Pregnancy
Polycythemia
Thyrotoxicosis
Rheumatoid arthritis (especially in patients with polycythaemia)
Eczema and psoriasis
 Deep telangiectasias
 Coxsackievirus A infection (Hand, foot and mouth disease)
 Rocky Mountain spotted fever
 Secondary syphilis
 Kawasaki disease
 Adverse drug reaction: palmoplantar erythrodysesthesia (acral erythema)

Because circulating levels of estrogen increase in both cirrhosis and pregnancy, estrogen was thought to be the main cause for the increased vascularity. More recently, nitric oxide has also been implicated in the pathogenesis of palmar erythema.

Treatment

Palmar erythema has no specific treatment. Management is based on the  underlying cause. When its cause is treated then patients get relief. If it is attributable to a particular drug then the drug should be withdrawn.

See also
 Toxic erythema
 List of cutaneous conditions

References

External links 

Erythemas